Māngere-Ōtāhuhu is a local government area in Auckland, in New Zealand's Auckland Region. It is governed by the Māngere-Ōtāhuhu Local Board and Auckland Council. It is within the council's Manukau Ward.

Geography

The area includes the suburbs of Māngere and Ōtāhuhu, and the neighbouring suburbs of Māngere East, Favona and Māngere Bridge.

The landscape is dominated by Māngere Mountain.

Another volcanic cone, Robertson Hill / Sturges Park / Mount Robertson, is also located in the area.

History

Te Tō Waka and Karetu, two historic portage routes through the area was used by Māori to transfer waka between Manukau Harbour and the Hauraki Gulf.

The Ōtuataua Stonefields Historic Reserve is a site of early Māori settlement.

Features

Auckland Airport, New Zealand's largest airport, dominates the south-eastern part of the area.

Ambury Regional Park is located in the north-west.

References